Saint Andrew Parish may refer to several places:

Saint Andrew, Barbados (parish)
Saint Andrew Parish, Dominica
Saint Andrew Parish, Grenada
Saint Andrew Parish, Jamaica
Saint Andrew Parish, Saint Vincent and the Grenadines
Saint Andrew Parish, Tobago, in Tobago
Saint Andrews Parish, New Brunswick, in Canada

See also
 St Andrew (disambiguation)
 St. Andrew's Church (disambiguation)
 St. Andrew's Cathedral (disambiguation)
 St. Andrew's School (disambiguation)
 San Andrés (disambiguation)
 San Andreas (disambiguation)
 Sveti Andrija (disambiguation)

Civil parishes in the Caribbean
Parish name disambiguation pages